Bamanghata is a village and a gram panchayat within the jurisdiction of the Bhangar police station in the Bhangar II CD block in the Baruipur subdivision of the South 24 Parganas district in the Indian state of West Bengal.

Geography

Transport
Bamanghata is on the State Highway 3.

Healthcare
Jirongachhi Rural Hospital, with 30 beds, at Jirongachhi, is the major government medical facility in the Bhangar II CD block.

References

Villages in South 24 Parganas district